Thomas Huff (born June 10, 1963) is an American politician serving as a member of the Kentucky House of Representatives from the 49th district. Elected in November 2018, he assumed office on January 1, 2019.

Early life 
Huff was born and raised in Shepherdsville, Kentucky.

Career 
Outside of politics, Huff works for Huff's Used Cars & Auto Parts. He was elected to the Kentucky House of Representatives in November 2018 and assumed office on January 1, 2019.

References 

1963 births
Living people
People from Shepherdsville, Kentucky
People from Bullitt County, Kentucky
Republican Party members of the Kentucky House of Representatives